Esens is a Samtgemeinde ("collective municipality") in the district of Wittmund, in Lower Saxony, Germany. Its seat is in the town Esens.

The Samtgemeinde Esens consists of the following municipalities:

 Dunum 
 Esens
 Holtgast 
 Moorweg 
 Neuharlingersiel 
 Stedesdorf 
 Werdum

Samtgemeinden in Lower Saxony
Towns and villages in East Frisia